Thomas Eugene White Jr. (born December 14, 1943) is an American businessman and former United States Army officer who served as senior executive at the now collapsed Enron and as the United States Secretary of the Army from May 31, 2001 until November 17, 2004.

Military career and education
White was born in Detroit, Michigan. In 1963 White graduated from Cass Technical High School in Detroit. He was a part of the JROTC program at Cass Tech, which is highly ranked every year in military competition. In 1967, White graduated from the United States Military Academy at West Point with a Bachelor of Science degree and was commissioned in the United States Army. In 1974, he received a Master of Science degree in operations research from the Naval Postgraduate School, Monterey, California. In 1984, he attended the United States Army War College, Carlisle, Pennsylvania.

During a long military career, that included two tours of duty in Vietnam, he served in a variety of capacities including:

Commander, 1st Squadron, 11th Armored Cavalry Regiment
Commander, 11th Armored Cavalry Regiment, V Corps
Director, Armor/Anti-Armor Special Task Force

In 1989, White was appointed executive assistant to the then chairman of the Joint Chiefs of Staff General Colin Powell, where he was described in The Washington Post by a mutual friend as Powell's "alter ego" in "a job that requires tremendous political sophistication." In July 1990 White retired from the Army with the rank of Brigadier General.

Business career
In 1990 White entered the private sector as Vice-Chairman of Enron Energy Services (E.E.S.), a subsidiary of the Enron Corporation responsible for providing energy outsource solutions. According to his original Department of Defense biography White was responsible for the delivery component of energy management services, which included:

Commodity management
Purchasing, maintaining and operating energy assets
Developing and implementing energy information services
Capital management
Facilities management

He was responsible for the Enron Engineering and Construction Company, which managed an extensive construction portfolio with domestic and international projects. White also served as a member of Enron's Executive Committee and was chairman and chief executive officer for Enron Operations Corporation.

Appointment as Secretary of the Army

White was a controversial choice for Government service despite his long military service due to his most recent position as an executive with the Enron Corporation. U.S. Secretary of Defense Donald Rumsfeld however had decided to make corporate experience one of the key requirements in his appointees.

White was sworn in on May 31, 2001 as 18th Secretary of the Army and was responsible for all matters relating to Army manpower, personnel, reserve affairs, installations, environmental issues, weapons systems and equipment acquisition, communications, and financial management. He led a work-force of over one million active duty, National Guard and Army Reserve soldiers and 270,000 civilian employees, he had stewardship over 15 million acres (60,000 km²) of land and an annual budget of nearly $70 billion.

White was immediately embroiled in controversy regarding his previous employment with Enron and what he may have known about some of Enron's questionable business practices.  His retention of a sizable amount of Enron stock fueled the perception of a conflict interest.

In 2002, White became involved with a dispute with Donald Rumsfeld over the proposed cancellation of the Army's Crusader artillery project.  White supported the Army view that the Crusader was vital to the Army's future and circulated "talking points" for congressional discussions extolling its value.  However, Rumsfeld decided it was not suited for wars of the future and eventually canceled the program.

In 2003, White refused to publicly rebuke General Eric Shinseki for his statement to the Senate Armed services committee that it would take "something in the order of several hundred thousand soldiers" to occupy Iraq after invasion. This, combined with White's actions on the Crusader, disagreements with Rumsfeld on the Stryker project, and his distracting association with Enron including the selling of restricted Enron stock through "private investments" (derivatives), prompted Rumsfeld to demand White's resignation. White resigned on April 25, 2003.

Controversy

While serving as Vice Chairman of Enron Energy Services White had actively pursued military contracts for the company and in 1999 had secured a prototype deal at Fort Hamilton for privatizing the power supply of army bases.  Enron had been the only bidder for this deal after White had controversially used his government and military contacts to secure key concessions.

In his first speech just "two weeks after he became secretary of the Army, White vowed to speed up the awarding of such contracts"; as the Enron Ft. Hamilton contract, despite the fact that he still held a considerable interest in Enron. A Pentagon spokeswoman responded to suggestions of a possible conflict of interests by saying that "Defense Secretary Donald Rumsfeld sees no conflict and has complete confidence in the Army secretary".

The Washington Post reported that in late October 2001, White made numerous phone calls to Enron executives including Vice President Jude Rolfes, former CEO Jeff Skilling and President current CEO Ken Lay. Shortly after the calls were made, White unloaded 200,000 Enron shares for $12 million. The L.A. Times reported that White had brief conversations with Rumsfeld in November and Powell in December, the focus of which were "a concern on their part for the impact that the bankruptcy of Enron may have had on my personal well-being. My response in both cases was that I had suffered significant personal losses but that I would persevere."

The New York Times reported that in late January 2002, Rep. Henry Waxman requested a meeting with White regarding the military contracts and the irregularities with the accounting at E.E.S. stating "you are in a unique position because you are the person in government who has the most intimate knowledge of Enron". Furthermore, The Washington Post reported that at this time White still held interests in Enron, including a claim on 50,000 stock options and an annuity paid by the company, despite having promised to divest himself at his confirmation hearing 8 months earlier.  This earned him a rebuke from Sens. Carl Levin (D-Mich.) and John Warner (R-Va.) of the Senate Armed Services Committee. He was also accused in The Washington Post of Misuse of Government Property, by allegedly using military jets for personal trips for himself and his wife. In July, following news reports of the company's involvement in the 2000–2001 California electricity crisis, White denied his involvement under oath before the Senate Commerce Committee.

References

External links

1943 births
Living people
United States Army personnel of the Vietnam War
Cass Technical High School alumni
United States Army generals
United States Department of Defense officials
United States Secretaries of the Army
United States Military Academy alumni
Recipients of the Silver Star
Recipients of the Legion of Merit
Recipients of the Distinguished Flying Cross (United States)
Naval Postgraduate School alumni
George W. Bush administration personnel
Recipients of the Defense Distinguished Service Medal